A Tree of Life: The Pittsburgh Synagogue Shooting is a 2022 documentary film about the survivors, family and community of the eleven people killed in the 2018 Pittsburgh synagogue shooting, the deadliest antisemitic attack in U.S. history.

The film was directed by Trish Adlesic.  Adlesic was visiting her father in Pittsburgh when the gunman walked into the Tree of Life synagogue and perpetrated the killing.

Idina Menzel co-wrote the original song "A Tree of Life, with her songwriting collaborator Kate Diaz, for the film.

Cast

References 

Films about antisemitism
Antisemitism
Antisemitism